International Workshop on Lung Health is a medical association known to work specifically in the respiratory medicine domain. It is known for organizing annual conferences on recent approaches of daily clinical methodologies.

History and Activity 
The organization was conceived during the consensus conference held in January 2013 in Monaco, which was supported by principality of Monaco and Publi Creations.  Francesco Blasi and Giorgio W. Canonica are serving as the president of the organization while Stefano Aliberti, Stefano Centanni and Tobias Welte are serving as the present chairman. The organization is known for convening annual conference and workshop for encouraging the confluence of views pertaining to different national health systems, difference clinical practices with associated culture. The conferences and workshops organized are known to receive endorsement of organizations and forums including Association Internationale pour la promotion de Formations Spécialisées en Médecine et en Sciences Biologiques (AFISM).

Notable publications 

 Comparison of Comfort and Effectiveness of Total Face Mask and Oronasal Mask in Noninvasive Positive Pressure Ventilation in Patients with Acute Respiratory Failure: A Clinical Trial. https://doi.org/10.1155/2017/2048032
 Relationship between the presence of bronchiectasis and acute exacerbation in Thai COPD patients. https://doi.org/10.2147/COPD.S139776
 Clinical and Prognostic Characteristics of Patients with Post-chronic Thromboembolic Pulmonary Hypertension (CTEPH). 
 Asthma knowledge, care, and outcome during pregnancy: The QAKCOP study. https://doi.org/10.1177/1479972318767719
 Effects of bronchodilation on biomarkers of peripheral airway inflammation in COPD. https://doi.org/10.1016/j.phrs.2018.05.010

Footnotes 

 Blasi, Francesco B.. Lung Diseases: Chronic Respiratory Infections. Switzerland, MDPI AG, 2018. 
 Annesi-Maesano, Isabella. Respiratory Epidemiology. United Kingdom, European Respiratory Society, 2014.
 Viral Infections in Children, Volume II. Germany, Springer International Publishing, 2017. 
 Zirpe, Kapil, et al. Critical Care Update 2019. India, Jaypee Brothers,Medical Publishers Pvt. Limited, 2019. 
 Introduction to Bronchoscopy. United Kingdom, Cambridge University Press, 2017. 
 Annual Update in Intensive Care and Emergency Medicine 2016. Germany, Springer International Publishing, 2016. 
 Clinical Pulmonology. United States, Hayle Medical. 
 Annual Update in Intensive Care and Emergency Medicine 2015. Germany, Springer International Publishing, 2015. 
 Blasi, Francesco, and Dimopoulos, Georgios. Textbook of Respiratory & Critical Care Infection. India, Jaypee Brothers,Medical Publishers Pvt. Limited, 2014. 
 Metabolism of Human Diseases: Organ Physiology and Pathophysiology. Austria, Springer Vienna, 2014.

References 

International medical associations of Europe
International professional associations